KK Hercegovac may refer to:
KK HEO, based in Bileća; formerly known as KK Hercegovac Bileća (1981–2012)
KK Hercegovac Gajdobra, based in Gajdobra, Bačka Palanka (2019–present)

See also 
 FK Hercegovac